Fundo Island is located off the northwest coast of Pemba Island, one of the two main islands of Tanzania's Zanzibar Archipelago.  It is one of the larger minor islands in the archipelago and the largest of those surrounding Pemba. Fundo Island is nine kilometres in length, though barely a kilometre in width, and is surrounded by a reef.

Together with the smaller Njao Island, which lies immediately to the north, and several smaller islands to the south, Fundo forms a natural barrier and breakwater for the harbour of the town of Wete, which lies six kilometres to the east.

Fishing on the island
Fundo Island is home to the community of Ndooni village. In 2018, a new management regime was introduced to the fisheries in the area. It was decided for the local octopus fisheries to be closed for three months, in order to allow the stock to recover. This resulted in a huge increase in fisherman's catches after the fishery was re-opened, with the opening day seeing more than a 20-fold jump in daily landings.

References

Finke, J. (2006) The Rough Guide to Zanzibar (2nd edition). New York: Rough Guides.

External links
 Location of Fundo Island

 Islands of Zanzibar
 Pemba Island
 Zanzibar Archipelago